Santiago Llorens Stadium is a softball stadium in Mayagüez.    It is located close to the Palacio de Recreación y Deportes. It will host the softball competition for the 2010 Central American and Caribbean Games.

It was commonly nicknamed as Liga de París (Paris Ward Baseball League Yard)

References

Sports in Mayagüez, Puerto Rico
Multi-purpose stadiums in the United States
Buildings and structures in Mayagüez, Puerto Rico
2010 Central American and Caribbean Games venues
Softball venues